Indonesia Today is the first English-language newscast ever carried by a private television network in Indonesia. It appeared on RCTI from 1 November 1996 to 31 August 2001. On 31 August 2001, Indonesia Today was discontinued due to lack of ratings and replaced by Indonesian-language criminal news, Sergap.

News anchor
 Desi Anwar
 Chrysanti Soewarso
 Jason Tedjakusmana
 Helmi Johannes

Rubrication
 In Focus
 Business and Financial
 The Diplomatic Pouch
 Politic
 Law and Criminal
 Social
 Health and Medical
 International
Art and culture
 Weather Forecast
 English Daily Newspaper (Morning Paper)
 The Jakarta Post
 Jakarta Straits Times
 Jakarta Daily News
 Agenda
 Headline News
 World Sport

Time slot history
 07.30-08.00 WIB (4 November 1996 – 4 February 2000)
 07.00-07.30 WIB (7 February 2000 – 31 August 2001)

See also
RCTI

References

Indonesian television news shows
1996 Indonesian television series debuts
2001 Indonesian television series endings
1990s Indonesian television series
2000s Indonesian television series
2010s Indonesian television series
RCTI original programming